Elena Vallortigara (born 21 September 1991) is an Italian high jumper who won the bronze medal at the 2022 World Athletics Championships in Eugene, Oregon.

Career

Vallortigara has won two bronze medals at the youth world level and eight national championship at senior level. She competed at the 2020 Summer Olympics, in High jump.

2018 progression
Prior to 2018 Vallortigara had a best of 1.91 m established in 2010 at the age of 18. In 2018 she improved to 2.02 m for the second best performance for the year, behind the 2.04 m of Mariya Lasitskene. During the season she had seven competitions with a result of at least 1.94 m.

Personal bests
High jump: 2.02 m ( London, 22 July 2018)
High jump indoor: 1.96 m ( Ancona, 23 February 2020)

Achievements

Progression

National titles
Vallortigara has won 9 national championships at individual senior level.
 Italian Athletics Championships
 High jump: 2018, 2020, 2021, 2022 (4)
 Italian Indoor Athletics Championships
 High jump: 2017, 2019, 2020, 2022, 2023 (5)

See also
 Female two metres club
 Italian all-time lists - High jump

References

External links
 

1991 births
Living people
Italian female high jumpers
Athletics competitors of Centro Sportivo Carabinieri
People from Schio
Italian Athletics Championships winners
Athletes (track and field) at the 2020 Summer Olympics
Olympic athletes of Italy